Gorodets may refer to:
Gorodets Urban Settlement, a municipal formation which the town of district significance of Gorodets in Gorodetsky District of Nizhny Novgorod Oblast, Russia is incorporated as
Gorodets, Russia, several inhabited localities in Russia
 Krasny Gorodets